Viktor Filipenkó (born 25 September 1991) is a Hungarian tennis player.

Filipenkó has a career high ATP singles ranking of 692 achieved on 29 July 2013. He also has a career high ATP doubles ranking of 709, achieved on 22 July 2013. Filipenkó has won 2 ITF doubles titles.
 
Filipenkó has represented Hungary at Davis Cup, where he has a win–loss record of 1–3.

Future and Challenger finals

Singles: 1 (0–1)

Doubles 9 (2–7)

Davis Cup

Participations: (1–3)

   indicates the outcome of the Davis Cup match followed by the score, date, place of event, the zonal classification and its phase, and the court surface.

References

External links 
 
 
 
 

1991 births
Living people
Hungarian male tennis players
Tennis players from Budapest
20th-century Hungarian people
21st-century Hungarian people